Old Coulsdon is a ward in the London Borough of Croydon, covering part of the Coulsdon area of London in the United Kingdom. The ward currently forms part of Chris Philp MP's Croydon South constituency.
At the 2011 Census the population of the former Coulsdon East Ward was 12,244.

The ward returns two councillors every four years to Croydon Council.

The ward was formed from part of the former Coulsdon East ward, following a boundary review in Croydon, ahead of the 2018 election.

List of Councillors

Mayoral election results 
Below are the results for the candidate which received the highest share of the popular vote in the ward at each mayoral election.

Ward Results

References

External links

Wards of the London Borough of Croydon